Luciano Silva Almeida (born April 14, 1975 in Santana do Livramento) is a Brazilian left back. He currently plays for Caxias.

Honours

Internacional

Rio Grande do Sul State League: 1997

Goiás

Goiás State League: 2002, 2006
Brazilian Center-West Cup: 2002

Criciúma

Brazilian League - Second Division: 2002
Santa Catarina State League: 2005

Botafogo

Rio de Janeiro's Cup: 2007, 2008

Vitória

Bahia State League: 2009

External links

 

1975 births
Living people
People from Santana do Livramento
Brazilian footballers
Sociedade Esportiva e Recreativa Caxias do Sul players
Sport Club Internacional players
América Futebol Clube (MG) players
Esporte Clube Juventude players
Associação Atlética Ponte Preta players
Goiás Esporte Clube players
Criciúma Esporte Clube players
Botafogo de Futebol e Regatas players
Esporte Clube Vitória players
Association football defenders
Sportspeople from Rio Grande do Sul